Leiolepis, commonly known as butterfly lizards or butterfly agamas, are group of agamid lizards. They are native to Peninsular Malaysia, Thailand, Myanmar, Laos, Cambodia, Indonesia, Ryukyu Islands (Japan), Vietnam, and Hainan (China). The genus includes both sexual and asexual species. Leiolepis is the sole genus of subfamily Leiolepidinae.

Description and ecology
Sexual species show sexual dimorphism. They are diurnal and live in flat, open areas with loose soil, which allows them to construct long, interconnected burrows used for refuge. They are omnivorous.

Species
Ten species are recognized as being valid.

Sexual species:
L. belliana  – common butterfly lizard  
L. guttata  – giant butterfly lizard, spotted butterfly lizard 
L. ocellata  – ocellated butterfly lizard
L. peguensis  – Burmese butterfly lizard 
L. reevesii  – Chinese butterfly lizard, Reeves's butterfly lizard 
L. rubritaeniata  – Reeves's butterfly lizard 
Asexual species:
L. boehmei  – Böhme's butterfly lizard
L. guentherpetersi  – Peters's butterfly lizard 
L. ngovantrii  – Ngo Van Tri's lady butterfly lizard
L. triploida  – Thai butterfly lizard, Malayan butterfly lizard

Nota bene: A binomial authority in parentheses indicates that the species was originally described in a genus other than Leiolepis.

Asexual species have arisen through hybridization of sexually-reproducing species.

Consumption
In the northeast region of Thailand it is popular to catch butterfly lizards and eat them. In the South Central Coast region of Vietnam, especially in Ninh Thuan Province, Leiolepis is considered a delicacy for its nutrional value and can fetch high prices on the market.

Diet
Butterfly Agamas commonly feast on insects (Worms, roaches, crickets, grasshoppers, larvae, beetles, moths) but can also eat fruits 
(Watermelon, apple, mango, papaya, dates, peaches, apricot) and vegetables (Collard greens, beet greens, mustard greens, broccoli, bell pepper, carrot, green bean). In captivity their meals should be dusted with a vitamin D3 calcium.

Relationship to humans

Captivity
Butterfly lizards can commonly be found in the pet trade. Not much is known about their breeding or raising their babies so most of the ones found in the pet trade are wild caught.

Traditional game
In Prachuap Khiri Khan Province, Thailand, there is a traditional game called "yæ̂ lng rū" (แย้ลงรู; literally: "butterfly lizards hole down").

References

Leiolepis
Lizard genera
Lizards of Asia
Taxa named by Georges Cuvier